Michael Wayne Adams, Jr. (born June 17, 1985) is a former American football cornerback. He was signed by the Arizona Cardinals as an undrafted free agent in 2007. He played college football at Louisiana.

On June 19, 2013, Adams signed a one-year contract with the Tampa Bay Buccaneers.

External links
Tampa Bay Buccaneers bio
Arizona Cardinals bio

1985 births
Living people
Players of American football from Dallas
American football cornerbacks
Louisiana Ragin' Cajuns football players
Arizona Cardinals players
Tampa Bay Buccaneers players